Zheng may refer to:

Zheng (surname), Chinese surname (鄭, 郑, Zhèng)
Zheng County, former name of Zhengzhou, capital of Henan, China
Guzheng, a Chinese zither instrument with bridges
Qin Shi Huang (259 BC – 210 BC), emperor of the Qin Dynasty, whose name was Zheng (政)

Historical regimes
Zheng (state) (806 BC–375 BC), an ancient state in China
Zheng (619–621), a state controlled by rebel leader Wang Shichong during the Sui–Tang transition
House of Koxinga (1655–1683), Ming partisans who ruled Taiwan during the early Qing

See also
Cheng (disambiguation)
Sheng (disambiguation)